Loncin Holdings, Ltd  is a large company in Chongqing, China that distributes throughout the world.
It trades under names such as Chongqing Longting Power Equipment, Longting and Loncin (USA) Inc.  It is known for its Loncin brand of motorcycle and ATVs produced by its subsidiary Longxin Motorcycle Industry Co., Ltd. and for the UAVs produced by its Loncin UAV subsidiary.  In Italy and Turkey, its motorcycles are sold under the Voge brand name, Viper Motorcycles in Ukraine, Minsk in Russia and Belarus, Italika and AKT from Mexico to Uruguay except Costa Rica, where it is called Katana and finally Zanella in Argentina.

Longxin Motorcycle Industry Co., Ltd
The Longxin Motorcycle Industry Co., Ltd subsidiary produces motorcycles; motorcycle engines; universal gasoline engine; ATV all-terrain vehicles; and parts and components under the brand name "Loncin".

The company operates production, distribution and marketing facilities  in Chongqing, Zhejiang, and Guangdong in China. It has annual production capacity of 2,500,000 motorcycles, 3,000,000 motorcycle engines, and 150,000 all-terrain vehicles (ATVs).

BMW Motorrad
In 2005, Loncin entered into an agreement to make G650GS motorcycle engines for German-based BMW Motorrad. The partnership began in 2007 and Loncin has produced motorcycle parts, engine components, and over 35,000 complete engines for BMW. Significant and technical benefits came for Loncin, in which they used the same engine to power the LX650 (also known as the CR9). This model is available only in markets specified by BMW under the agreement.

In 2017, BMW Motorrad introduced the F850GS and F750GS to succeed both the F800GS and F700GS respectively. While the outgoing models previously used Rotax 799cc engines, the F850GS and F750GS models now come equipped with slightly more powerful 853cc engines made by Loncin. Additionally, the C400X and C400GT scooters also roll off production lines at Loncin.

Environmental scandal
In 2012, Loncin was found by the United States Environmental Protection Agency to have imported 7,115 vehicles that violated the Clean Air Act, by submitting false and incomplete certification. The company was ordered to pay a US$680,000 penalty, and to support an air pollution mitigation project for the vehicles' excess emissions.

References

External links

Motorcycle manufacturers of China
Holding companies of China
Manufacturing companies based in Chongqing
2012 crimes in the United States
2012 in the environment
2012 scandals
Chinese brands